Jeff Louder (born December 8, 1977) is an American former professional road racing cyclist, who rode professionally between 2000 and 2014 for the , ,  and  teams. Originally from Salt Lake City, Utah, Louder won the 2008 Tour of Utah, and took part in the 2010 Giro d'Italia. At the 2014 Tour of Utah Louder announced that he would be retiring from the sport at the end of the season.

Major results

2003
 8th, Grand Prix Pino Cerami
2004
 2nd, Overall, Cascade Cycling Classic
 3rd, Overall, Tour of Qinghai Lake
 1st, Stage 2
2005
 2nd, National Time Trial Championships
 3rd, Overall, Cascade Cycling Classic
 3rd, Overall, Tour de Beauce
1st,  Mountains classification
2006
 2nd, Overall, Cascade Cycling Classic
 3rd, Overall, Tour of Utah
 4th, Overall, Tour de Taiwan
2007
 1st,  Mountains classification, Tour of Missouri
 1st, Stage 5, Cascade Cycling Classic
 7th, Overall, Tour de Georgia
2008
 1st, Overall,  Tour of Utah
1st, Stage 4
 1st, Stage 2, Redlands Bicycle Classic
 2nd, Overall, Cascade Cycling Classic
1st, Stage 4
2009
 1st, Overall,  Redlands Bicycle Classic
1st, Stage 1
 3rd, Overall, Cascade Cycling Classic
 3rd, Overall, Tour of Utah
 3rd, National Road Race Championships
2010
 1st, Stage 4, Tour of Utah
2011
 10th, Overall, Tour of Utah
2012
 6th, Tour of the Battenkill

References

External links
 Jeff Louder Profile

1977 births
Sportspeople from Salt Lake City
American male cyclists
Living people
Cyclists from Utah